International Conference on Very Large Data Bases or VLDB conference is an annual conference held by the non-profit Very Large Data Base Endowment Inc. While named after very large databases, the conference covers the research and development results in the broader field of database management. The mission of VLDB Endowment is to "promote and exchange scholarly work in databases and related fields throughout the world." The VLDB conference began in 1975 and is now closely associated with SIGMOD and SIGKDD.

Venues

See also 
 XLDB

References

External links 
 VLDB Endowment Inc.

Computer science conferences